Gareth Frodsham (born ) is an English professional rugby league footballer, formerly of Pilkington Recs, St. Helens, Batley Bulldogs and North Wales Crusaders.  He has also played for the Rhode Island Rebellion in the USA Rugby League and currently plays for Haresfinch ARLFC.

References

External links
(archived by web.archive.org) St Helens profile
Saints Heritage Society profile

1989 births
Living people
Batley Bulldogs players
English rugby league players
North Wales Crusaders players
Pilkington Recs players
Rhode Island Rebellion players
Rochdale Hornets players
Rugby league players from St Helens, Merseyside
Rugby league props
St Helens R.F.C. players